Wildlife Photographer of the Year is an annual international wildlife photography competition staged by the Natural History Museum in London, England. There is an exhibition of the winning and commended images each year at the museum, which later tours around the world. The event has been described as one of the most prestigious photography competitions in the world.

It was known as BG Wildlife Photographer of the Year from 1990 to 2003, and briefly as Shell Wildlife Photographer of the Year, Kodak Wildlife Photographer of the Year and Prudential Wildlife Photographer of the Year. The first competition was held in 1964, with three categories and around 600 entries. In 2008 the competition received over 32,000 entries from 3100 photographers in 82 countries.

A book of winning entries and runners-up has been published each year since 1992, with two books being published in 1994 (the first three volumes were published the year after the corresponding competitions were held). Early volumes have become quite collectable.

Competition

A maximum of 25 images ranging from intimate animal portraits to atmospheric landscapes, ground-breaking photojournalism to innovative technique can be submitted once a year, in 12-17 permanent and alternate categories.  Since 2003 the grand prize has been selected from among the winning images of the categories and has been awarded to a single image in adult and young competition too. The photographer aged 17 and under submitting the best image receives the title “The Young Wildlife Photographer of the Year”, while the author of the best image over 17 years of age becomes “The Wildlife Photographer of the Year”. (This award has never been won in adult category more than once.) The deadline of submission of the images is around late February, and the results become public in mid-October.

The winning images are selected from among approximately 50,000 entries received from almost 100 countries around the globe, in three rounds by a prestigious and professional jury. 
The awards ceremony takes place in the Natural History Museum in London. On this date the latest Wildlife Photographer of the Year portfolio, introducing the winning images, comes out. 
Following the awards ceremony, the extremely high-quality and major Wildlife Photographer of the Year exhibition opens its gates in London and after that touring worldwide throughout the year, attracting more than 5 million visitors.

Categories

Photographers can enter their images into a range of categories, whose criteria are mostly based on the subject matter of the images. There are also 3 categories for under 18's, and 3 special awards. The number and name of categories changes nearly every year. In each category a winning, runner-up and several highly commended images are usually chosen, although sometimes the judges will not choose a winner or runner up in a particular category if they deem the standard of entries not to be high enough. The categories in the 2016 competition were as follows: 
 Mammals
 Birds
 Reptiles, Amphibians and Fishes
 Invertebrates
 Plants and Fungi
 Underwater
 On Land
 In the Skies
 Urban
 Detail
 Impressions
 Black and White
 Wildlife Photojournalist: Single Image
 Wildlife Photojournalist: Photo Story Award
 Rising Star Portfolio Award (ages 18 to 25)
 Wildlife Photographer Portfolio Award (ages 26 and over)

2009 controversy 

The overall 2009 competition winner, José Luis Rodriguez, was stripped of his award and his £10,000 prize following allegations from rival Spanish photographers that his picture of an Iberian wolf leaping a cattle-pen in Ávila had been staged, using a captive animal to do so. The jury opened an investigation and ultimately disqualified it. He was also prohibited from entering the competition for life. It was, however, too late to remove the image from the accompanying book. There was much controversy as to the legitimacy of such claims, which, some say, were not backed by evidence but by skepticism from some experts and the jury itself.

Grand title winners

The full list
Full available database from 1984 on

References

Bibliography

External links
 Wildlife photographer of the year (Natural History Museum website)
 Guardian slideshow

Photography awards
Natural History Museum, London
Photography exhibitions
Awards established in 1964
Nature photography
1964 establishments in the United Kingdom
Annual events in the United Kingdom
Wildlife of the United Kingdom
Photography in the United Kingdom
BBC awards
|}